ALC may refer to:

Places
 Alicante Airport, by IATA airport code
 Alliance station, Ohio, US, Amtrak code

Business
 Atlantic Lottery Corporation
 A.L.C, US fashion company

Organizations
 Air Lease Corporation
 American Lacrosse Conference
 American Legend Cooperative, North American mink fur marketing cooperative
 American Lutheran Church (1930), until 1960
 American Lutheran Church, 1960 - 1987
 Army Legal Corps
 Atlantic Lacrosse Conference
 Australian Lutheran College

Science and technology
 Air Logistics Center, of the US Air Force
 ALC (automobile), UK
 Asynchronous Layered Coding
  Landing Craft Assault, Britain, WWII
 ALC201A, ALC202, etc., Avance Logic AC'97 audio chipsets
 Attributive Concept Language with Complements, a description logic